is a former Japanese football player.

Playing career
Saiki was born in Yamanashi Prefecture on August 20, 1970. After graduating from Aoyama Gakuin University, he joined Yokohama Marinos in 1993. However he could not play at all in the match. In 1995, he moved to his local club Ventforet Kofu in Japan Football League. He named a captain and played as regular player as defensive midfielder. The club was promoted to J2 League in 1999. He retired end of 1999 season.

Club statistics

References

External links

1970 births
Living people
Aoyama Gakuin University alumni
Association football people from Yamanashi Prefecture
Japanese footballers
J1 League players
J2 League players
Japan Football League (1992–1998) players
Yokohama F. Marinos players
Ventforet Kofu players
Association football midfielders